This is a list of events in Canada and its predecessors that are commonly characterized as massacres. Massacre is defined in the Oxford English Dictionary as "the indiscriminate and brutal slaughter of people or (less commonly) animals; carnage, butchery, slaughter in numbers"; it also states that the term is used "in the names of certain massacres of history".

For single perpetrator events and shooting sprees, see Lists of rampage killers and :Category:Spree shootings in Canada
For school shootings, see :Category:School shootings in Canada and :Category:School killings in Canada
For North American First Nations massacres, see List of Indian massacres.
For terrorism, see Terrorism in Canada.
For serial killers, see List of serial killers in Canada.

List

See also
List of conflicts in Canada

References

Sources 

 

Canada
massacres
 
Lists of disasters in Canada